Westside Christian College is a Christian school located in Goodna, Ipswich, Queensland, Australia. It is coeducational and teaches students from Pre-Prep to Year 12. The current Principal of the College is Craig Schmidt. Joshua Mansfield is the current Head of the Secondary College.

History
The school was opened as Goodna Christian School in 1977.  In 2005 the Australian Government's Department of Education, Employment and Workplace Relations awarded the school A$115,000 for premises improvement and in 2006 over A$125,000.

Principals 
 1977                Paul Colen
 1978 - 1984    Ron Norman
 1985 - 2015    Christopher Meadows
 2016–2021     Barry Leverton
 2022 - present Craig Schmidt

Timeline 
 1957 - The Reformed Churches of Australia began a campaign to promote Christian education in the form of Christian Parent-Controlled Schools.
 1962 - The Multi-denominational Association for Parent-Controlled Christian Schools (APCCS) of Brisbane was founded.
 1965 - The National Union of Associations for Christian Parent-Controlled Schools (NUACPCS) was founded.
 1965 - Organizational structure of APCCS was revised to include an elected board of directors with subordinate subcommittees.
 1972 - Land was purchased for Goodna Christian School.
 1976 - Construction for first phase completed.
 1977 - February, official opening as primary school.
 1977 - March, Dedication Service
 1981 - Adjacent lot of land purchased for planned expansion; grade 8 added, each year another grade added to grade 12.
 1992 - More land purchased for additional expansion.
 1995 - Preschool classes added and located in new building with grades 1 to 3 & a1/2.
 1995 - Name changed to Westside Christian College.
 2002 - 25th anniversary celebration and special reunion was held.
 2017 - 40th anniversary celebration and reunion dinner May 26.

Programs 
Westside Christian College is registered on the Commonwealth Register of Institutions and Courses for Overseas Students.

References 

Educational institutions established in 1977
High schools in Queensland
Education in Ipswich, Queensland
Private schools in Queensland
Schools in Ipswich, Queensland
1977 establishments in Australia